The École Nationale Supérieure d'Électrochimie et d'Électrométallurgie de Grenoble, or ENSEEG,  was one of the French Grandes écoles of engineering (engineering schools). It has been created in 1921 under the name Institut d’électrochimie et d’électrométallurgie (IEE) (Institute of Electrochemistry and Electrometallurgy). The name ENSEEG has been chosen in 1948 and ENSEEG has been part of Grenoble Institute of Technology (INPG or GIT) since its creation in 1971. Therefore, the name INPG-ENSEEG has also been commonly used.

ENSEEG delivered a multidisciplinary education in physical chemistry. The ENSEEG engineers are especially competent in materials science, process engineering and electrochemistry. From September 2008, ENSEEG merged with two other Grandes écoles to create Phelma.

External links
 ENSEEG Website 
 ENSEEG Student Website 
 ENSEEG Student Firm 

Electrochimie et d'Électrométallurgie de Grenoble
Electrochemical engineering
Metallurgical organizations
Educational institutions established in 1921
Educational institutions disestablished in 2008
1921 establishments in France
2008 disestablishments in France